Daughters of Eve is a 1979 novel by Lois Duncan. Incorporating feminist themes, the novel follows a group of young women who become convinced to punish their fathers by a charismatic teacher.

Plot
The girls at Modesta High School, located in a small town in rural Michigan feel like they are stuck in an anti-feminist time warp-they are faced with sexism at every turn, and they have had enough. Sponsored by their new charismatic art teacher, Ms. Irene Stark, they band together to form the Daughters of Eve. It is more than a school club-it is a secret society, a sisterhood. 

Stark preaches women's liberation, which convinces each of the girls to stand up against the males who oppress them in their day-to-day lives.
At first, it seems that they are successfully changing the way guys at school treat them. But Ms. Stark urges them to take ever more vindictive action and brutal revenge.

Controversy
Due to its thematic concerns with rape, abortion, domestic violence, feminism and antifeminism, the novel was banned from libraries in several states upon its 1997 republication, namely from Jackson County School libraries in West Virginia in 1997, as well as school libraries in Virginia, Indiana, and New Mexico from 2000 to 2005.

References

External links
Daughters of Eve summary at the Buffalo & Erie County Public Library

1979 American novels
American young adult novels
Feminist literature
Novels by Lois Duncan
Novels set in Michigan
Obscenity controversies in literature
Little, Brown and Company books